David Barrett is an American entrepreneur and software engineer. He is founder and CEO of Expensify, a software company that has developed an expense management system for personal and business use.

Early life and career

Barrett grew up in Saginaw, Michigan, where he began programming at the age of 6. He earned a bachelor's degree in computer engineering from the University of Michigan, where he worked on campus in a virtual reality laboratory. After graduating from college, he moved to Texas, where he helped develop 3D graphics engines for the video game industry.

He later joined Red Swoosh, a peer-to-peer file sharing company co-founded by Travis Kalanick. Barrett left Red Swoosh in 2008, a year after it was purchased by Akamai Technologies.

Expensify

Barrett remained in San Francisco after leaving Red Swoosh. Barrett said Expensify's roots can be traced to a project he started to assist homeless individuals in his neighborhood without simply handing over cash. He began developing a debit card that donors could give to homeless individuals for use at pre-approved vendors.

Banks were not interested in the idea. Barrett refined that concept, though, into a prepaid debit card that businesses could give to employees to cover expenses. Staked with $15 million from the sale of Red Swoosh, Barrett launched Expensify in San Francisco in 2008. He moved the company's main offices to Portland, Oregon, in 2017, citing quality-of-life reasons. Barrett, who has kept a majority stake in Expensify, has been dismissive of the venture capital community in the past. “I think the entire playbook for being a private company right now is how you pump and dump a startup to some bigger sucker," he said.

Political activism 

In October 2020, Barrett sent an email to 10 million Expensify customers urging them to vote for Joe Biden in the upcoming U.S. presidential election against Donald Trump. “If you are a U.S. citizen, anything less than a vote for Biden is a vote against democracy,” Barrett wrote.

Some customers objected to a vendor using their email addresses to promote a political message, and Barrett said he received death threats after sending it.

“I think there’s no such thing in a democracy as being apolitical. Every action you take is your position. I think that a large number of these tech companies, by saying, ‘Oh, we’re apolitical,’ that's a very convenient way of saying, ‘No, I’m voting for the status quo. I support the current administration, and I’m not going to take actions to do anything about it because it’s actually good for business.’ I think it's actually pretty cynical.” 

In January 2021, on Martin Luther King Jr. Day, Barrett sent another letter to customers. In it, he pledged that the company would donate $3 million to fight “systemic injustices” and narrow the gender pay gap. In the letter, Barrett said for every dollar the company pays white male employees, it will donate an additional 25 cents to its charity, Expensify.org.

References

American businesspeople
Year of birth missing (living people)
Living people
University of Michigan alumni